Juul Bosmans (23 April 1914 – 29 November 2000) was a Belgian hurdler. He competed in the men's 110 metres hurdles at the 1936 Summer Olympics.

References

1914 births
2000 deaths
Athletes (track and field) at the 1936 Summer Olympics
Belgian male hurdlers
Olympic athletes of Belgium
Place of birth missing